John of Jerusalem  may refer to:

Monarchs 
 John of Brienne (c. 1170–1237), King of Jerusalem (as John I)
 John I of Cyprus (1259 or c. 1267–1285), King of Cyprus and Jerusalem (as John II)
 John II of Cyprus (1432–1458), King of Cyprus and Jerusalem (as John III)

Religious leaders 
 John the Baptist (died ca. 28 AD), Patron saint of Jerusalem
 John II of Jerusalem (c. 387–417), Bishop of Jerusalem
 John III of Jerusalem (516-524), Patriarch of Jerusalem
 John IV of Jerusalem (575-594), Patriarch of Jerusalem
 John V of Jerusalem (706-735), Patriarch of Jerusalem
 John VI of Jerusalem (838-842), Patriarch of Jerusalem
 John VII of Jerusalem (964-966), Patriarch of Jerusalem
 John VIII of Jerusalem (1106–1156), Patriarch of Jerusalem in exile
 John IX of Jerusalem (1156–1166), Patriarch of Jerusalem in exile